The Road to Wellville is a 1994 American comedy drama film adaptation of T. Coraghessan Boyle's novel of the same name, which tells the story of the doctor and clean-living advocate John Harvey Kellogg and his methods employed at the Battle Creek Sanitarium at the beginning of the 20th century. The film was written and directed by Alan Parker.

The film stars Anthony Hopkins as Dr. Kellogg, Matthew Broderick as William Lightbody, Bridget Fonda as his spouse Eleanor, John Cusack as Charles Ossining, Dana Carvey as the doctor's adopted son George, and Colm Meaney as Dr. Lionel Badger.

It was filmed in New Paltz, New York at the Mohonk Mountain House. Other locations were the North Carolina towns of Winnabow and Wilmington.

Plot
Dr. John Harvey Kellogg opened a sanitarium in Battle Creek, Michigan, where he practiced his unusual methods for maintaining health, including colonic irrigation, electrical stimulus and sexual abstinence, vegetarianism and physical exercise. The sanitarium attracts well-to-do patients including William and Eleanor Lightbody, who are suffering from poor health following the death of their child. On their way to Battle Creek they meet Charles Ossining, hoping to make a fortune by exploiting the fad for health food cereals.

Ossining finds a partner in Goodloe Bender. Having enlisted the services of George Kellogg, the doctor's estranged adopted son, they attempt to produce "Kellogg's Perfo Flakes."

In the sanitarium, Will Lightbody is separated from his wife, and is soon harboring lustful thoughts toward Nurse Graves and patient Ida Muntz. His wife Eleanor, meanwhile, befriends Virginia Cranehill, who has a modern attitude toward sexual pleasure, influenced by the works of Dr. Lionel Badger. Will eventually succumbs to Ida Muntz's charms. Later he learns that Ida has died during treatment. Following the electrocution of a patient in the defective sinusoidal bath, and the discovery of yet another death, Will suffers a breakdown, flees the sanitarium, gets drunk and eats meat. At a restaurant, he meets Ossining, and agrees to invest $1,000 in his health food business. Will returns drunk to the sanitarium, where he is reprimanded by Dr. Kellogg and is abandoned by a distraught Eleanor.

Ossining's business is a disaster, with no edible product. He and the partners resort to stealing Kellogg's cornflakes and repackaging them in their own boxes. Ossining meets his aunt, his sole investor, on visiting day at Kellogg's sanitarium, and is there exposed as a fraud and arrested.

Nurse Graves attempts to seduce Will, who is guilt-stricken and spurns her advances. He searches for Eleanor, only to find her and Virginia Cranehill receiving clitoral massages from Dr. Spitzvogel while Dr. Badger masturbates. Will is incensed, thrashes Dr. Spitzvogel with a branch and takes Eleanor away.

George Kellogg visits his father, but things go badly. George burns down the sanitarium. In the ensuing chaos, Ossining escapes. Kellogg seems to reconcile with George in the mud bath in the aftermath of the fire.

In a final coda, the Lightbodys have reconciled and are happily married, with four daughters. Will receives a check for $1,000 from Ossining, who has become a cola beverage tycoon. Dr. Kellogg dies of a heart attack while diving from a high board.

Cast

Reception

Critical reception
The film received mixed to negative reactions upon its release, with much criticism towards the scatological nature of the film. Hopkins' portrayal of Kellogg was also singled out for criticism. The film has a 39% rating on Rotten Tomatoes based on 18 reviews. Despite this, not all reviews were negative. Writing in Bright Lights Film Journal, Tanfer Emin-Tunc commented: "It is a sophisticated blend of humor and documented historical material that seeks to question the various forms that race and class have assumed in twentieth-century American society." Gene Siskel gave it a thumbs-down review, and was audibly displeased when Roger Ebert gave it a thumbs-up. Ebert said part of his positive review stemmed from his own interest in health foods and products.

Box office
The film opened at number 5 at the US box office with $2,580,108 in its opening weekend. It grossed $6,562,513 in the US and Canada and $26 million worldwide. After regular showings on cable TV and a hard to find DVD release, the film became a cult classic and was finally released on Blu-ray by Shout! Factory in 2020.

Year-end lists 
 5th worst – Peter Travers, Rolling Stone
 5th worst – Janet Maslin, The New York Times
 Top 10 worst (not ranked) – Betsy Pickle, Knoxville News Sentinel
 Guilty pleasure – Douglas Armstrong, The Milwaukee Journal
 Dishonorable mention – Glenn Lovell, San Jose Mercury News

References

External links
 
 
 
 

1994 films
1994 comedy-drama films
American comedy-drama films
American satirical films
Films directed by Alan Parker
Films scored by Rachel Portman
Films about psychiatry
Films based on American novels
Films set in Michigan
Films set in the 1890s
Films set in the 1900s
Films shot in New York (state)
Films shot in North Carolina
Columbia Pictures films
Films with screenplays by Alan Parker
Beacon Pictures films
Films produced by Armyan Bernstein
1990s English-language films
1990s American films